Eva Chaloupková (born 1905, date of death unknown) was a Czech swimmer. She competed in the women's 400 metre freestyle event at the 1924 Summer Olympics.

References

External links
 

1905 births
Year of death missing
Czech female swimmers
Olympic swimmers of Czechoslovakia
Swimmers at the 1924 Summer Olympics
Place of birth missing
Czech female freestyle swimmers